Haerehuka  (flourished 1835–1865) was a New Zealand tribal leader, warrior and orator.

References

Year of birth unknown
Year of death unknown
Ngāti Whakaue people